Lepidozikania similis is a moth of the family Erebidae first described by Travassos in 1949. It is found in Brazil.

References

Phaegopterina
Moths described in 1949